The Chamber of Deputies of Iraq (Majlis an-Nuwwab) was the elected lower house of the bicameral parliament established by the Mandatory Iraq's 1925 constitution. There were initially 87 deputies, who were elected The Chamber of Deputies remained in existence until the 1958 revolution. The number of deputies was later increased to 141.

Presidents of the Constituent Assembly

Presidents of the Chamber of Deputies

See also
 Kingdom of Iraq
 Senate of Iraq

References

Kingdom of Iraq
1920s establishments in Iraq
Iraq
Iraqi parliaments
Organizations established in 1925
Organizations disestablished in 1958
1958 disestablishments in Iraq